This is a list of educational institutions in the city of Islamabad, Pakistan.

Primary and secondary educational institutions
 Aims Education System
 Schola Nova F-8/3, Islamabad
 Imperial International School & College Islamabad, 316, Service Rd North, F-10/3, Islamabad
 Super Nova School, 16, Nazim Uddin, Rd, F-8/1, Islamabad
 Edopia
 The Green Valley Child Development Centre
 Siddeeq Public School
 TQM Model School, H13 (opposite G13 Sector), Islamabad, Pakistan
 Roots School System
 Beaconhouse School System
 Froebel's International School
 City School System
 [[Capital Development Authority Model Schoo
 Lahore Grammar School
 The Oaks British School (Closed)
 PakTurk International Schools and Colleges
 Fazaia Education System School, Islamabad
 Smart School Systems
 Westminster School and College
 Oxbridge International Grammar School
 United City School System, Sector D-13 Islamabad
 Islamabad College of Arts and Sciences
 Bright Model School
 International Islamic University Islamabad Schools
 Jinnah Muslim School & College, Park Road, Taramari Chowk, Islamabad
 The Spirit School, Model Town Humak, Islamabad
 Treehouse School
 Islamabad Convent Schools — two high schools in F-8 and H-8 sectors, under the administration of the Catholic Church
 The Millennium Education Pakistan (Roots Millennium Schools Islamabad)

Colleges and high schools
Following is the list of Secondary and Higher Secondary education institutes in Islamabad which are registered by the Federal Board of Intermediate and Secondary Education;
Aims Education System
Islamabad Model College for Boys F-10/3, Street 65 F-10/3 Islamabad
Schola Nova F-8/3, Islamabad
Republic College, Main GT Road, Opposite DHA Phase-2, Islamabad
Imperial International School & College Islamabad, 316, Service Rd North, F-10/3, Islamabad
Super Nova School, 16, Nazim Uddin, Rd, F-8/1, Islamabad
 OPF Boys College Islamabad
 Islamabad College for Boys, G-6/3
 CDA Model School
 Beaconhouse School System
 Bahria College Islamabad
 NIMLS College Islamabad
 Republic College
 Roots School System
 Froebel's International School
 Punjab College of Commerce
 Bahria foundation College Islamabad
 Fazaia Intermediate College, Islamabad
 Army Public Schools & Colleges System
 Grafton College Islamabad
 Institute of Islamic Sciences
 Indus Group of Colleges
 Polymathic Education System School & College
 School of Business and Management Islamabad
 Polymathic Universal School System
 Islamabad College of Arts and Sciences
 Jinnah Muslim School & College, Park Road, Taramari Chowk, Islamabad
 Future World Schools & Colleges Islamabad
 The Millennium Universal College Islamabad
The Ascend School Islamabad
 The Red Oak High by The Treehouse H-11

Multi-level schools
 Islamabad Japanese School - Elementary through Japanese junior high school year 3 (equivalent to Pakistani high school year 1)
 École Française d'Islamabad (Closed) - Nursery through high school/college (secondary school done by CNED correspondence)

Tertiary and quaternary educational institutions
 Muslim Youth University (MYU), Islamabad
 Air University
 International Islamic University
 Allama Iqbal Open University
 Alkauthar Islamic University
 Bahria University
 Capital University of Science & Technology
 Center for Advanced Studies in Engineering
 College of Physicians & Surgeons Pakistan
 COMSATS Institute of Information Technology
 Federal Urdu University of Arts, Science and Technology
 Foundation University, Islamabad
 Hamdard University
 Isra University
 Iqra University
 Preston University
 Institute of Space Technology
 Mohammad Ali Jinnah University
 National Defence University, Islamabad
 National University of Modern Languages
 National University of Sciences and Technology
 National University of Computer and Emerging Sciences
 Pakistan Institute of Development Economics
 Pakistan Institute of Engineering & Applied Sciences
 Quaid-i-Azam University
 Riphah International University
 Shaheed Zulfiqar Ali Bhutto Institute of Science and Technology
 University College of Islamabad
 University of Lahore
 Virtual University of Pakistan
 Unique Institute Of Technical & Professional Education Islamabad
 The Millennium Universal College (TMUC) Islamabad

See also

References

Universities and colleges in Islamabad
Pakistan education-related lists
Islamabad
Islamabad-related lists